Rhazinilam is an alkaloid first isolated in 1965 by Linde from the Melodinus australis plant. It was later isolated from the shrub Rhazya stricta as well as from other organisms.

Biological activity
Rhazinilam has activity similar to that of colchicine, taxol and vinblastine, acting as a spindle poison.

Total synthesis 
Rhazinilam was first synthesized in 1973 by Smith and coworkers, and multiple subsequent times.

Trauner synthesis

References 

Pyrroles
Alkaloids
Total synthesis
Plant toxins